WIRX (107.1 FM, "Rock 107 WIRX") is a mainstream rock radio station owned by Mid-West Family Broadcasting located in Benton Harbor, Michigan. The station's city of license is St. Joseph, Michigan broadcasting in HD from a tower at the edge of Benton Township, Michigan.  The station features The Plan B Morning Show.

History
According to the "History of 107.1 FM St. Joseph", the 107.1 frequency was started as a music outlet to sister station WSJM in 1964 by Mid-West Family Broadcasting (MWF), which is based in Madison, Wisconsin. WSJM-FM began broadcasting in stereo on 107.1 MHz in 1965 and regularly provided stereo remote broadcasts by the Twin Cities Symphony and other events.

In 1969, the station changed its call letters to WIRX(FM) and switched to a completely jockless, automated Country format, tagged "WIRX Country."

1979 began the AOR/Top 40 a.k.a. Rock 40 format for the station and dubbed "The All New Rock 107 WIRX, The Music Works" playing artists from both the current and past years of rock.

The station switched its format slightly to a more AC-leaning rock format and was rebranded as "The New Magic 107 WIRX" with Jim Gifford and The Champions of Breakfast as the morning show.

WIRX returned to their roots as "Rock 107 WIRX" in 1991 and began running a mainstream rock format which it continues to do to this day.

The station is managed on a local level to this day, much as it was when it first came on the air.

Morning shows
The station has had several morning shows over the last decade.
Hosts have included the syndicated "Free Beer and Hot Wings", Jason Lee, Rex Charger, and the current "Plan B Morning Show" with Brock Havens.

References

External links
Mid-West Family Broadcasting
WSJM, Inc. / Mid-West Family Broadcasting in Michigan's Great Southwest

IRX
Mainstream rock radio stations in the United States
Radio stations established in 1965